Ites plagiatus is a species of beetle in the family Cerambycidae. It was described by Waterhouse in 1880. It is known from Ecuador, Brazil and Bolivia.

References

Hemilophini
Beetles described in 1880